Hacboister is a hamlet of the municipality of Herve, Wallonia, district of Bolland, located in the province of Liège, Belgium. 

References

Herve
Populated places in Liège Province